The 2005–06 ACB season was the 23rd season of the Liga ACB.

Promotion and relegation 
Teams promoted from LEB

Teams relegated to LEB Oro

Team information

Stadia and locations

Team standings

Stats leaders

Points

Rebounds

Assists

References

External links
 ACB.com 
 linguasport.com 

 
Liga ACB seasons
 
Spain